Newport-on-Tay West railway station served the town of Newport-on-Tay, Fife, Scotland, from 1879 to 1969 on the Newport Railway.

History
The station was opened as West Newport on 12 May 1879 by the Newport Railway. On the west end was the station building, which was brick built. It closed on 12 January 1880 but reopened on 20 June 1887. Its name was changed to Newport-on-Tay West in 1950. It closed on 5 May 1969.

References

Disused railway stations in Fife
Railway stations in Great Britain opened in 1879
Railway stations in Great Britain closed in 1969
1879 establishments in Scotland
1969 disestablishments in Scotland